The 1996–97 Tampa Bay Lightning season was the Lightning's fifth season of operation. The Lightning were unable to qualify for the playoffs despite making their first playoff appearance the previous year and losing to the Philadelphia Flyers in the first round.

Regular season

Final standings

Game log

Player stats

Regular season
Scoring

Goaltending

Note: Pos = Position; GP = Games played; G = Goals; A = Assists; Pts = Points; +/- = plus/minus; PIM = Penalty minutes; PPG = Power-play goals; SHG = Short-handed goals; GWG = Game-winning goals
MIN = Minutes played; W = Wins; L = Losses; T = Ties; GA = Goals-against; GAA = Goals-against average; SO = Shutouts; SA = Shots against; SV = Shots saved; SV% = Save percentage;

Draft picks
Tampa Bay's draft picks at the 1996 NHL Entry Draft held at the Kiel Center in St. Louis, Missouri.

See also
1996–97 NHL season

References
 

T
T
Tampa Bay Lightning seasons
Tampa Bay Lightning
Tampa Bay Lightning